CXOU J061705.3+222127 is a neutron star. It was likely formed 30,000 years ago in the supernova that created the supernova remnant IC 443, the "Jellyfish Nebula." It is travelling at approximately 800,000 km/h away from the site.

References

See also
 IC 443, the likely supernova remnant of the creation event of the star.

Gemini (constellation)
Neutron stars